Oliver Butterworth (May 23, 1915 – September 17, 1990) was an American children's author and educator.

Biography
Butterworth was born in Hartford, Connecticut, and spent much of his life as a teacher, teaching at Kent School in Kent, Connecticut, from 1937 to 1947 and Junior School in West Hartford, Connecticut, from 1947 to 1949. Additionally, beginning in 1947, he taught English at Hartford College for Women in Hartford, Connecticut, until the late 1980s.

Butterworth was an author of many children's books, most of which took place in the New England area of the United States in which he was born and raised. His most popular book was The Enormous Egg, the fanciful story of farmboy Nate Twitchell who raises a dinosaur (a triceratops named "Uncle  Beazley") that hatches from a hen's egg in 1950s New England.

In 1940, he married fellow teacher and political activist Miriam Brooks and the couple had four children. Butterworth died of cancer in West Hartford, aged 75.

Children's books
The Enormous Egg (1956)
The Trouble with Jenny's Ear (1960)
The Narrow Passage (1973)

References

External links
 

1915 births
1990 deaths
American children's writers
20th-century American educators
Deaths from cancer in Connecticut
Kent School alumni
Writers from Hartford, Connecticut
University of Hartford faculty